The Galway Clinic is a private hospital in Galway, Ireland.

History
The hospital was founded by surgeons Joseph Sheehan and Jimmy Sheehan, who had established the Blackrock Clinic in Dublin. It was built at a cost of €100 million and opened in June 2004. It brought radiation therapy, cardiac surgery and PET/CT scanning to the west of Ireland for the first time.

Services
The hospital has 136 beds and 36 consultant suites.

References

Hospital buildings completed in 2004
2004 establishments in Ireland
Buildings and structures in Galway (city)
Hospitals established in 2004
Hospitals in County Galway
Private hospitals in the Republic of Ireland
21st-century architecture in the Republic of Ireland